Zahr-el-Din El-Najem (born 11 January 1977) is a retired Syrian hurdler and athlete. He competed in the men's 400 metres hurdles at the 2000 Summer Olympics. At continental level, he won one bronze medal in the 400 m hurdles at the Asian Athletics Championships and participated at the 1998 Asian Games. His personal best of 49.33 seconds is the Syrian indoor record for the 400 m event.

Personal bests
Outdoor
 400 metres: 47.18 NR (Beirut 1999)
 400 metres hurdles: 49.67 (Jakarta 2000)
Indoor
 400 metres: 48.32 NiR (Tehran 2004)

Competition record

References

External links
 

1977 births
Living people
Athletes (track and field) at the 2000 Summer Olympics
Syrian male hurdlers
Olympic athletes of Syria
Place of birth missing (living people)
Athletes (track and field) at the 1998 Asian Games
Asian Games competitors for Syria
20th-century Syrian people